Prerana "Rinku" Mahadeo Rajguru (born 3 June 2001) is an Indian actress primarily working in Marathi language films, best known for her role in the film Sairat.

Life and career
Rajguru was born in Akluj town of Maharashtra to Mahadeo Rajguru on 3 June 2001.

In 2016, she made her debut with Nagraj Manjule's Sairat and won a National Film Award - Special Jury Award / Special Mention (Feature Film) at the 63rd National Film Awards for her performance.

In the Kannada remake of Sairat, Manasu Mallige, Rajguru reprised her role. Later, she appeared in films like Kaagar, Makeup, and Unpaused.

In 2022, she made her Bollywood debut with Jhund.

Rajguru, along with Lara Dutta, debuted in digital space through Hotstar's action-comedy Hundred, released in 2020.

In 2021, she was seen in ZEE5's 200 Halla Ho.

Filmography

Films

Web series

Awards
 National Film Award – Special Mention (feature film) for film Sairat
 Filmfare Marathi Awards 2017 - Best Actress Award for Sairat
 Filmfare Marathi Awards 2017 - Best Female Debut for Sairat
 Zee Cine Awards 2017 - Best Marathi Actor for Sairat

References

External links

 

2001 births
Living people
Actresses in Hindi cinema
Actresses in Marathi cinema
Indian film actresses
People from Akluj
Special Mention (feature film) National Film Award winners
Filmfare Marathi Awards winners